Sergio Escudero may also refer to:

 Sergio Escudero (footballer, born 1964), Argentine-Japanese footballer
 Sergio Escudero (footballer, born 1983), Argentine footballer
 Sergio Escudero (footballer, born 1988), Japanese footballer
 Sergio Escudero (footballer, born 1989), Spanish footballer